Sir John Waters Kirwan, KCMG (2 December 1869 – 9 September 1949) was the President of the Western Australian Legislative Council and first Federal member for Kalgoorlie in the Australian House of Representatives.

Biography

Early life
He was born in Liverpool, England, of Irish parents.

Career
He did literary work in London and Dublin before coming to Australia in 1889. At first, he continued writing in Brisbane, Melbourne and South Australian newspapers but moved to Kalgoorlie in 1895, attracted by the great gold discoveries.

In Kalgoorlie, he edited both the Western Argus and Kalgoorlie Miner newspapers, with the latter growing in size and importance under his editorship. In 1898, he stood for the Legislative Council seat of North-East Province and lost by 90 votes.  In 1901, he agreed to stand for the federal seat of Kalgoorlie under the Free Trade Party banner, and won the seat comfortably, becoming the youngest member of the First House of Representatives. During his time in federal politics he was a member of the Royal Commission on Iron Bonuses. He was defeated by the Labor nominee C. E. Frazer in the second federal election.

In 1908, he was elected to the Western Australian Legislative Council for the South Province, where he sat until 1946, and served as President of the Council from 1926 to 1946. Throughout his tenure, he remained an Independent, although he was an enthusiastic supporter of the Scaddan Labor government from 1911 until 1916, voting in 165 divisions with the government and none against. Following its defeat in 1916, he worked with governments of both major political persuasions and strongly advocated for his Goldfields constituency.

He served as an inaugural member on the Senate of the University of Western Australia from 1912 until 1924. He was also involved in the organising committee of the Western Australia Centenary of 1929. He was knighted in 1930 and appointed K.C.M.G. in 1947.

He was a member of the Royal Western Australian Historical Society, contributing numerous articles to Early Days and various international periodicals such as The Times and The Review of Reviews. He also wrote an autobiography in 1936.

Personal life
In 1912, he married Teresa Gertrude Quinlan, the daughter of politician Timothy Quinlan, and they had three sons (a twin male having died at birth), two grandchildren (a boy and a girl) and three great grandchildren (a girl and two boys).

Death
He died in the Perth suburb of Subiaco in 1949.

Notes

Further reading
 My Life's Adventure (autobiography, hosted by University of Sydney)

1869 births
1949 deaths
Members of the Australian House of Representatives for Kalgoorlie
Presidents of the Western Australian Legislative Council
Australian Knights Commander of the Order of St Michael and St George
Australian politicians awarded knighthoods
Free Trade Party members of the Parliament of Australia
20th-century Australian politicians